Vunnadhi Okate Zindagi is a 2017 Indian Telugu-language coming-of-age drama film written and directed by Kishore Tirumala. It stars Ram Pothineni, Lavanya Tripathi, Anupama Parameswaran and Sree Vishnu. The film released on 27 October 2017. It was produced by Sravanthi Ravi Kishore and Krishna Chaitanya under Sravanthi Cinematics and PR Cinemas.

Plot
The story revolves around five childhood friends Abhi, Vasu, Sai, Satish and Koushik.

Abhi is a restaurant owner in Milan. He meets a girl named Shreya and becomes friends with her. Shreya falls in love with him and proposes to him, but Abhi declines. When Shreya asks why he narrates his flashback.

Abhi and his friends are very close and are always there for one another. Things change when Abhi and Vasu fall in love with the same girl, Mahalakshmi a.k.a. Maha, who is studying medicine. After knowing that she is a classical singer, Abhi gives her a chance to sing in his band after observing her voice, and Vasu encourages her to perform in the program by getting the acceptance of her parents. But when both reveal that they love the same girl, they decide to ask her whom she loves and at that night she thinks that who must she choose. Then she reveals that she loves Vasu. But Abhi doesn't mind as he is a happy-go-lucky guy. Vasu begins to spend more time with Maha and starts ignoring Abhi. He also forgets to go to Abhi's mother's grave on the day of her death, as he always does, and goes to celebrate Maha's parents' anniversary, instead. This starts a fight between them. Vasu says that priorities change with time and this time Maha is his priority. After hearing this, Abhi gets hurt and leaves for Milan without telling anyone.

Back in the present, Abhi meets Vasu's sister, Ramya, in his own restaurant and finds out that Maha died in a car accident. Abhi feels bad about losing Maha and he feels responsible for Vasu's situation. He learns of Sai's marriage and decides to attend it. Abhi leaves to Ooty for the marriage, only to find Vasu becomes dull and lifeless after Maha's death four years ago. Vasu avoids Abhi for some days as Abhi left him alone when he was needed the most.

Vasu and Abhi meet a girl named Meghana a.k.a. Maggie and her friend, Kanuka (Himaja), who are the wedding planners for Sai's marriage. Meanwhile, Sai's marriage has been canceled because of an argument between Sai's mother and the bride Srushti because of a petty issue with Srushti's dog. Maggie feels stressed about her loan because she had invested a lot of money and hopes on this wedding. Though she was in loss, she had invested through loans and she didn't pay back any of them. Abhi decides to pay her loan installment. Maggie promises Abhi to pay him back with interest. Later, the gang decides to forget about the wedding and plan for a trek. On the way to their trek, the local taxi drivers stop them to organize a monopoly system by force and push Maggie, which leads to a fight between them and Abhi. When Abhi is hit by one of the goons, Vasu joins the fight. Later, Abhi pours his heart out that he didn't know about Maha and tells Vasu that he would have come immediately if he knew. They both happily unite after sorting out their differences. As they all spend time together, Maggie becomes close to both Vasu and Abhi. Satish thinks that she might cause a fight between Vasu and Abhi again, just like Maha did.

In a sudden encounter, Maha's friend Usha gives Maha's personal belongings to Vasu. Later, with the help of Abhi, Sai confesses his feelings on Srushti. Srushti accepts his proposal. Then, the marriage programs begin again according to the plan with the acceptance of their families. After the completion of the wedding, Satish convinces Abhi that Vasu loves Maggie and tells him to let them be together. Then Abhi leaves the place without telling anyone. Later Maggie and Vasu ask about Abhi, making Satish reveal everything to them. Vasu tells him that he doesn't have any feelings for Maggie and that they are just good friends.  Then, the gang finds him in Ooty's railway station.

Vasu reveals that he went through Maha's things and learned the truth. Vasu reads her diary and gets to know that she actually loved Abhi, and not him. A day before saying yes to Vasu, Maha met Abhi and proposed to him. But Abhi requested her to accept Vasu's proposal because he is very sensitive and might get depressed otherwise. Maha obeyed Abhi and accepted Vasu's proposal. Later, she understood Vasu's love and changed her mind. At the end of the diary, she asked herself about what would happen if Vasu learned about this. Would he have been ok with what happened? Then, Vasu asks Abhi why he did that. Abhi says that when he lost his mother, Vasu took her place in his life and that his priorities wouldn't have changed anytime, meaning Vasu would always be a priority to Abhi. Vasu unites Abhi and Maggie and the film ends with everyone smiling and looking happy.

Cast

 Ram Pothineni as Abhiram "Abhi"
 Sree Vishnu as Vemuri "Vasu" Vasudevaiah
 Lavanya Tripathi as Meghana "Maggie"
 Anupama Parameswaran as Mahalakshmi "Maha"
 Priyadarshi Pullikonda as Sathish
 Kireeti Damaraju as Sai
 Himaja as Kanuka
 Anand as Abhi's father
 Prabhu as Vasu's father
 Anisha Ambrose as Shreya (cameo appearance)
 Raj Madiraju as Maha's father
 Ashish Gandhi as Raghu
 Koushik Rachapudi as Koushik
 Priya Chowdary as Usha, Maha's friend
 Kaumudi Nemani as Srushti, Sai's fiancée
 Alka Rathore as Ramya, Vasu's sister
 Geetanjali as Vasu's grandmother
 Master Hansik as young Abhi
 Dakshith as young Vasu

Release

The film was released on 27 October 2017.

Soundtrack

The music was composed by Devi Sri Prasad. The song "Trendu Maarina" was separately released on Friendship Day.

Reception

Critical reception 
Sangeetha Devi Dundoo of The Hindu wrote: "There's a lot to like in this film and yet, it feels like a stretch. A crispier narrative would have made it a good coming-of-age buddy flick".
The Times of India gave 3 out of 5 stars, stating: "The film is beautifully shot, with the locales of Vizag and Ooty adding in to its laid-back vibe. Music by Devi Sri Prasad is translated better on-screen than expected".
IndiaGlitz gave 2.5 out of 5 stars, stating: "The story interests.  The dialogues are cool.  But the slow pace and clichéd elements do the narration in".

Box office

References

External links

2017 films
2010s Telugu-language films
2010s coming-of-age comedy-drama films
2010s buddy comedy-drama films
Indian buddy comedy-drama films
Indian coming-of-age comedy-drama films
Films about friendship
Films scored by Devi Sri Prasad
Films directed by Kishore Tirumala
2017 romantic comedy-drama films
Indian romantic comedy-drama films
Films set in Andhra Pradesh
Films set in Visakhapatnam
Films shot in Visakhapatnam
Films shot in Andhra Pradesh